Herbert Schob (12 May 1915 – 5 April 1981) was a Luftwaffe ace and recipient of the Knight's Cross of the Iron Cross during World War II. The Knight's Cross of the Iron Cross was awarded to recognise extreme battlefield bravery or successful military leadership.  During his career Herbert Schob was credited with 34 aerial victories, 6 in the Spanish Civil War and 28 during World War II.

Awards
 Spanish Cross in Gold with Swords
 Iron Cross (1939) 2nd Class & 1st Class 
 German Cross in Gold on 14 April 1942 as Oberfeldwebel in the 2./Nachtjagdgeschwader 4
 Knight's Cross of the Iron Cross on 9 June 1944 as Oberleutnant and pilot in the II./Zerstörergeschwader 76

Notes

References

Citations

Bibliography

External links
Lexikon der Wehrmacht

1915 births
1981 deaths
Military personnel from Leipzig
People from the Kingdom of Saxony
Luftwaffe pilots
German World War II flying aces
Spanish Civil War flying aces
German military personnel of the Spanish Civil War
Recipients of the Gold German Cross
Recipients of the Knight's Cross of the Iron Cross
Condor Legion personnel